Olive, the Other Reindeer is a 1999 American 3D computer-animated Christmas comedy musical film written by Steve Young, based on the 1997 children's book by J. Otto Seibold, and directed by Academy Award-nominated animator Steve Moore (credited as "Oscar Moore"). The feature was produced by Matt Groening's The Curiosity Company and animated by DNA Productions. Drew Barrymore voices the title character, and she is credited as an executive producer on the special.

The special first aired on December 17, 1999, alongside Futurama on Fox, ten years after the premiere date of Groening's television series The Simpsons. It was produced by Fox Television Studios and Flower Films. During its initial broadcast, the special brought in 6.06 million viewers, and an additional 5.22 million the following year. After airing again the following year, the special made its first cable television premiere on Nickelodeon on December 15, 2001; It would then premiere the following year on Cartoon Network on December 14, 2002, and aired during each holiday season until it was last seen on December 24, 2012. The special would also air on other local syndicated networks, such as MyNetworkTV, The CW and WGN-TV.

The story is based on the 1997 children's book by Vivian Walsh and J. Otto Seibold and illustrated by J. Otto Seibold. In the song, Rudolph the Red-Nosed Reindeer, the lyric "All of the other reindeer" can be misheard in dialects with the cot–caught merger as the mondegreen "Olive, the other reindeer". The special was nominated for the Emmy Award for Outstanding Animated Program.

Plot
The story follows an anthropomorphic Jack Russell Terrier named Olive. While in town, she meets Martini, a con artist penguin from whom she buys a counterfeit Rolex watch. When she returns home she finds her owner, Tim, sad that there "won't be any Christmas". Olive discovers that Blitzen, one of Santa's reindeer, is injured and unable to fly. Santa expresses in a radio interview that Christmas isn't cancelled if his sleigh can be pulled by "all of the other reindeer". Olive's pet flea, Fido, mishears this as "Olive the other reindeer", and Olive becomes convinced that it is she Santa is referring to, prompting her to travel to the North Pole to help pull the sleigh.

On the way to the bus station, Olive runs into a disgruntled Postman who is frustrated by having to deliver mail during the Christmas period, and expresses that he is glad Christmas might be cancelled. He learns Olive is trying to save Santa's flight, and is determined to stop Olive from saving Christmas. Olive goes to the bus station to buy a ticket to Arctic Junction. Martini shows up and Olive buys him a bus ticket, but before they can leave the station, Olive is captured by the Postman, who abducts her, claiming she is wanted for mail fraud. After she pleads for Martini's help, Martini trips the Postman, allowing Martini and Olive to catch the bus.

On the bus, Olive and Martini talk to an Inuit couple and bus driver Richard Stands. They believe Olive misheard Santa, but wish her luck. The Postman pulls up next to the bus in his mail truck, but Martini makes a paper airplane, tells him, "Deliver this, punk!" and throws it at the Postman, knocking him off the road. When they arrive at Arctic Junction, they must wait for the next bus, so they go to a restaurant. The Postman, disguised as their waitress, lures Olive outside by stating that Santa is waiting for her. The Postman throws Olive into his truck, and while he is driving away, Olive finds a package addressed to her from "Deus Ex Machina" containing a metal file that Olive uses to escape.

Olive returns to the Junction, and Martini and Richard, having discovered the Postman's actions, ask her how she got away. Olive and Martini, having missed the bus, go inside a nearby bar and are initially harassed by the bar's patrons, including bar owner Round John Virgin. Olive stands up to them, giving a speech about the meaning of Christmas. The patrons apologize for their behavior and Round John Virgin offers Martini and Olive a ride to the North Pole. At the North Pole, Olive is denied entry, but Martini distracts the guard, allowing Olive to get inside and look for Santa. Aside from Blitzen's injury, Santa is unsure about going out for Christmas, due to having received mean-spirited letters addressed from children. Olive convinces Santa that the letters are from the Postman, and persuades Santa not to give up on Christmas; Santa thanks Olive, and she joins the other reindeer in order to fly the sleigh.

Before they leave, the Postman switches the bag of toys with a bag of junk mail and kidnaps Martini. Later, Santa discovers what happened, and Olive follows the Postman's scent to track him down. Olive struggles with the Postman, and Martini scares the Postman with a jack-in-the-box, and he hits his head and is knocked unconscious. They retrieve the presents, rescue Martini, and then deliver the presents to the world. Santa gets lost in fog, and Olive guides the sleigh back to the North Pole by following the scent of cookies baked by Mrs. Claus. Comet gives Olive a ride home and she makes amends with Tim, who is happy to see her. The Postman is bound with packing tape and fitted with cardboard "wings" and put in the penguin exhibit in the zoo in Martini's place, while Martini is now in charge of the mail.

Cast

Music
Music by Christopher Tyng, lyrics by Steve Young

"The Days Still Remaining 'Til Christmas" performed by Drew Barrymore
"Christmas (Bah, Bug and Hum!)" performed by Dan Castellaneta
"We're Not So Bad" performed by Michael Stipe of R.E.M.
"Merry Christmas After All" performed by Big Bad Voodoo Daddy with Drew Barrymore
"The Days Still Remaining 'Til Christmas (reprise)" performed by Drew Barrymore

See also
 List of Christmas films
 Santa Claus in film

Notes

References

External links
 
 

1999 television specials
1990s animated television specials
1999 computer-animated films
Animated films about dogs
Annie Award winners
Christmas television specials
Christmas characters
Fictional dogs
Works by Matt Groening
Santa's helpers
1990s children's fantasy films
Flower Films films
Christmas children's books
Santa Claus in film
Santa Claus in television
20th Century Fox Animation films
Films set in Paris
Films set in Tokyo
Films set in Sydney
Films set in the Arctic
Films set in the United States
Films set in Vatican City
1990s American television specials
Michael Stipe
20th Century Fox Television films
Fox Television Animation films
The Curiosity Company films
The ULULU Company films
DNA Productions films
Films scored by Christopher Tyng
American Christmas television specials
Animated Christmas television specials
Santa Claus's reindeer
20th Century Fox animated films
American picture books
Fox television specials